is a Japanese physicist, engineer and inventor specializing in the field of semiconductor technology. For his work he was awarded the 2014 Nobel Prize in Physics together with Isamu Akasaki and Shuji Nakamura for "the invention of efficient blue light-emitting diodes which has enabled bright and energy-saving white light sources".

Amano was elected as a member of the National Academy of Engineering in 2016 for the development of p-type gallium nitride (GaN) doping, enabling blue semiconductor LEDs.

Early life and education
Amano was born in Hamamatsu, Japan, on September 11, 1960. He received his BE, ME and DE degree in 1983, 1985 and 1989, respectively, from Nagoya University.

During elementary school days, he played soccer as a goalkeeper and softball as a catcher. He was also passionate about amateur radio and despite hating studying, he was good at mathematics. Upon entering high school, he began taking his studies seriously and became a top student by studying every day late into the night.

Career

From 1988 to 1992, he was a research associate at Nagoya University. In 1992, he moved to Meijo University, where he was an assistant professor. From 1998 to 2002, He was an associate professor. In 2002, he became a professor. In 2010, he moved to the Graduate School of Engineering, Nagoya University, where he is currently a professor.

He joined Professor Isamu Akasaki's group in 1982 as an undergraduate student. Since then, he has been doing research on the growth, characterization and device applications of group III nitride semiconductors, which are well known as materials used in blue light-emitting diodes today. In 1985, he developed low-temperature deposited buffer layers for the growth of group III nitride semiconductor films on a sapphire substrate, which led to the realization of group-III-nitride semiconductor based light-emitting diodes and laser diodes. In 1989, he succeeded in growing p-type GaN and fabricating a p-n-junction-type GaN-based UV/blue light-emitting diode for the first time in the world.

Known to be keen on research, Amano's laboratory was always lit late at night, such as weekdays, holidays, New Year's Day, and was called "no night castle". According to his students in the laboratory, Amano has an optimistic and temperate personality, and is never angry.

Awards

 1994 – Fifth Optoelectronics Conference A Special Award
 1996 – IEEE/LEOS Engineering Achievement Award
 1998 – Japanese Journal of Applied Physics Award for the best review paper
 1998 – British Rank Prize
 2001 – Marubun Academic Award
 2002 – Takeda Award
 2003 – SSDM Award
 2004 – TITech精密工学研究所第1回P＆Iパテント・オブ・ザ・イヤー
 2008 – 日本結晶成長学会論文賞
 2014 – APEX/JJAP Editorial Contribution Award der Japan Society of Applied Physics
 2014 – Nobel Prize in Physics
 2015 – Chu-Nichi Culture Prize
 2015 – Special Achievement Award, Institute of Electronics, Information and Communication Engineers
 2015 – Prizes for Science and Technology (Research Category) by the Minister of Education, Culture, Sports, Science and Technology
 2015 – 産学官連携功労者表彰日本学術会議会長賞
 2015 – Asia Game Changer Award

Honors

 2009 – Fellow, Japan Society of Applied Physics
 2009 – Nistep (National Institute of Science and Technology Policy) Researcher from the Ministry of Education of Japan
 2011 – Fellow, Institute of Physics
 2014 – Person of Cultural Merit, the Japanese Government
 2014 – Order of Culture, the Japanese Emperor
 2015 – Honorary citizenship of Shizuoka prefecture
 2015 – Honorary citizenship of Hamamatsu City
 2015 – Aichi Prefecture Academic Honors
 2015 – Nagoya City Academic Honors
 2015 – Honorary Fellow, Japan Sweden Society
 2015 – Honorary citizenship of Aichi prefecture
 2015 – 丸八会顕彰
 2016 – Foreign Member of the National Academy of Engineering
 2019 - Foreign members of the Chinese Academy of Engineering
 2022 - Members of the Japan Academy

Family
Amano's wife is a Japanese lecturer at Comenius University in Bratislava, Slovakia.

Selected publications
 
 
 
 
 
 I. Akasaki, H. Amano, K. Itoh, N. Koide & K. Manabe, Int. Phys. Conf. Ser. 129, 851 (1992).

See also
 List of Japanese Nobel laureates

References

External links
 

Living people
Academic staff of Nagoya University
1960 births
Japanese Nobel laureates
Nobel laureates in Physics
21st-century Japanese physicists
People from Hamamatsu
Recipients of the Order of Culture
Foreign associates of the National Academy of Engineering
Foreign members of the Chinese Academy of Engineering
Members of the Japan Academy
Amateur radio people
Asia Game Changer Award winners
Fellows of the American Physical Society
Nagoya University alumni